Made is the ninth studio album by American rapper Scarface. The album was released on December 4, 2007, by Rap-A-Lot Records, Asylum Records and Atlantic Records. The album was both critically and commercially successful, making it to 17 on the Billboard 200 and 2 on the Top R&B/Hip-Hop Albums. One single was released, "Girl You Know" featuring R&B singer, Trey Songz, which became a minor hit on the R&B charts.

Track listing

Chart positions

Weekly charts

Year-end charts

References 

2007 albums
Scarface (rapper) albums
Albums produced by Cozmo
Albums produced by Drumma Boy
Albums produced by Nottz
Albums produced by N.O. Joe
Albums produced by Mike Dean (record producer)